The Complaint of an Empress (Die Klage der Kaiserin),  is a 1990 film directed by Pina Bausch. It is the only film she directed.

Cast 
In alphabetical order
Mariko Aoyama
Anne Marie Benati
Bénédicte Billiet
Rolando Brenes Calvo
Antonio Carallo
Finola Cronin
Dominique Duszynski

Barbara Hampel
Kyomi Ichida
Urs Kaufmann
Ed Kortlandt
Beatrice Libonati
Anne Martin
Dominique Mercy

Helena Pikon
Dana Sapiro
Jean-Laurent Sasportes

Julie Ann Stanzak
Mark Alan Wilson

References

External links

1990 films
West German films
1990 drama films
1990s dance films
German drama films
1990s German films